The Battle of Antietam, or Battle of Sharpsburg particularly in the Southern United States, was a battle of the American Civil War fought on September 17, 1862, between Confederate Gen. Robert E. Lee's Army of Northern Virginia and Union Gen. George B. McClellan's Army of the Potomac near Sharpsburg, Maryland, and Antietam Creek. Part of the Maryland Campaign, it was the first field army–level engagement in the Eastern Theater of the American Civil War to take place on Union soil. It remains the bloodiest day in American history, with a combined tally of 22,727 dead, wounded, or missing. Although the Union army suffered heavier casualties than the Confederates, the battle was a major turning point in the Union's favor.

After pursuing Confederate Gen. Robert E. Lee into Maryland, Maj. Gen. George B. McClellan of the Union Army launched attacks against Lee's army who were in defensive positions behind Antietam Creek. At dawn on September 17, Maj. Gen. Joseph Hooker's corps mounted a powerful assault on Lee's left flank.  Attacks and counterattacks swept across Miller's Cornfield, and fighting swirled around the Dunker Church. Union assaults against the Sunken Road eventually pierced the Confederate center, but the Federal advantage was not followed up. In the afternoon, Union Maj. Gen. Ambrose Burnside's corps entered the action, capturing a stone bridge over Antietam Creek and advancing against the Confederate right. At a crucial moment, Confederate Maj. Gen. A. P. Hill's division arrived from Harpers Ferry and launched a surprise counterattack, driving back Burnside and ending the battle. Although outnumbered two-to-one, Lee committed his entire force, while McClellan sent in less than three-quarters of his army, enabling Lee to fight the Federals to a standstill. During the night, both armies consolidated their lines. In spite of crippling casualties, Lee continued to skirmish with McClellan throughout September 18, while removing his battered army south of the Potomac River.

McClellan successfully turned Lee's invasion back, making the battle a Union victory, but President Abraham Lincoln, unhappy with McClellan's general pattern of overcaution and his failure to pursue the retreating Lee, relieved McClellan of command in November. From a tactical standpoint, the battle was somewhat inconclusive; the Union army successfully repelled the Confederate invasion but suffered heavier casualties and failed to defeat Lee's army outright.  However, it was a significant turning point in the war in favor of the Union due in large part to its political ramifications: the battle's result gave Lincoln the political confidence to issue the Emancipation Proclamation, declaring all those held as slaves within enemy territory free. This effectively discouraged the British and French governments from recognizing the Confederacy, as neither power wished to give the appearance of supporting slavery.

Background

Robert E. Lee's Army of Northern Virginia—about 55,000 men—entered the state of Maryland on September 3, following their victory at Second Bull Run on August 30. Emboldened by success, the Confederate leadership intended to take the war into enemy territory. Lee's invasion of Maryland was intended to run simultaneously with an invasion of Kentucky by the armies of Braxton Bragg and Edmund Kirby Smith. It was also necessary for logistical reasons, as northern Virginia's farms had been stripped bare of food. Based on events such as the Baltimore riots in the spring of 1861 and the fact that President Lincoln had to pass through the city in disguise en route to his inauguration, Confederate leaders assumed that Maryland would welcome the Confederate forces warmly. They sang the tune "Maryland, My Maryland!" as they marched, but by the fall of 1862 pro-Union sentiment was winning out, especially in the western parts of the state. Civilians generally hid inside their houses as Lee's army passed through their towns, or watched in cold silence, while the Army of the Potomac was cheered and encouraged. Some Confederate politicians, including President Jefferson Davis, believed that the prospect of foreign recognition would increase if the Confederacy won a military victory on Union soil; such a victory might gain recognition and financial support from the United Kingdom and France, although there is no evidence that Lee thought the Confederacy should base its military plans on this possibility.

While McClellan's 87,000-man Army of the Potomac was moving to intercept Lee, two Union soldiers (Cpl. Barton W. Mitchell and First Sergeant John M. Bloss of the 27th Indiana Volunteer Infantry) discovered a mislaid copy of Lee's detailed battle plans—Special Order 191—wrapped around three cigars. The order indicated that Lee had divided his army and dispersed portions geographically (to Harpers Ferry, West Virginia, and Hagerstown, Maryland), thus making each subject to isolation and defeat if McClellan could move quickly enough. McClellan waited about 18 hours before deciding to take advantage of this intelligence and reposition his forces, thus squandering an opportunity to defeat Lee decisively.

There were two significant engagements in the Maryland campaign prior to the major battle of Antietam: Maj. Gen. Thomas J. "Stonewall" Jackson's capture of Harpers Ferry and McClellan's assault through the Blue Ridge Mountains in the Battle of South Mountain. The former was significant because a large portion of Lee's army was absent from the start of the battle of Antietam, attending to the surrender of the Union garrison; the latter because stout Confederate defenses at two passes through the mountains delayed McClellan's advance enough for Lee to concentrate the remainder of his army at Sharpsburg.

Opposing forces

Union

Maj. Gen. George B. McClellan's Army of the Potomac, bolstered by units absorbed from John Pope's Army of Virginia, included six infantry corps.

The I Corps, under Maj. Gen. Joseph Hooker, consisted of the divisions of:
 Brig. Gen. Abner Doubleday (brigades of Col. Walter Phelps, Brig. Gens. Marsena R. Patrick and John Gibbon, and Lt. Col. J. William Hofmann).
 Brig. Gen. James B. Ricketts (brigades of Brig. Gen. Abram Duryée, Col. William H. Christian, and Brig. Gen. George L. Hartsuff).
 Brig. Gen. George G. Meade (brigades of Brig. Gen. Truman Seymour, Col. Albert Magilton and Lt. Col. Robert Anderson).

The II Corps, under Maj. Gen. Edwin V. Sumner, consisted of the divisions of:
 Maj. Gen. Israel B. Richardson (brigades of Brig. Gen. John C. Caldwell, Brig. Gen. Thomas F. Meagher, and Col. John R. Brooke).
 Maj. Gen. John Sedgwick (brigades of Brig. Gens. Willis A. Gorman, Oliver O. Howard, and Napoleon J.T. Dana).
 Brig. Gen. William H. French (brigades of Brig. Gen. Nathan Kimball, Col. Dwight Morris, and Brig. Gen. Max Weber).

The V Corps, under Maj. Gen. Fitz John Porter, consisted of the divisions of:
 Maj. Gen. George W. Morell (brigades of Col. James Barnes, Brig. Gen. Charles Griffin, and Col. T.B.W. Stockton).
 Brig. Gen. George Sykes (brigades of Lt. Col. Robert C. Buchanan, Maj. Charles S. Lovell, and Col. Gouverneur K. Warren).
 Brig. Gen. Andrew A. Humphreys (brigades of Brig. Gen. Erastus B. Tyler and Col. Peter H. Allabach).

The VI Corps, under Maj. Gen. William B. Franklin, consisted of the divisions of:
 Maj. Gen. Henry W. Slocum (brigades of Col. Alfred T.A. Torbert, Col. Joseph J. Bartlett, and Brig. Gen. John Newton).
 Maj. Gen. William F. "Baldy" Smith (brigades of Brig. Gens. Winfield S. Hancock and William T. H. Brooks and Col. William H. Irwin).
 A division from the IV Corps under Maj. Gen. Darius N. Couch (brigades of Brig. Gens. Charles Devens, Jr., Albion P. Howe, and John Cochran).

The IX Corps, under Maj. Gen. Ambrose E. Burnside (Brig. Gen. Jacob D. Cox exercised operational command during the battle), consisted of the divisions of:
 Brig. Gen. Orlando B. Willcox (brigades of Cols. Benjamin C. Christ and Thomas Welsh).
 Brig. Gen. Samuel D. Sturgis (brigades of Brig. Gens. James Nagle and Edward Ferrero).
 Brig. Gen. Isaac P. Rodman (brigades of Cols. Harrison S. Fairchild and Edward Harland).
 Kanawha Division, under Col. Eliakim P. Scammon (brigades of Cols. Hugh Ewing and George Crook).

The XII Corps, under Maj. Gen. Joseph K. Mansfield, consisted of the divisions of:
 Brig. Gen. Alpheus S. Williams (brigades of Brig. Gens. Samuel W. Crawford and George H. Gordon).
 Brig. Gen. George S. Greene (brigades of Lt. Col. Hector Tyndale, Col. Henry J. Stainrook, and Col. William B. Goodrich).

The Cavalry Division of Brig. Gen. Alfred Pleasonton consisted of the brigades of Maj. Charles J. Whiting and Cols. John F. Farnsworth, Richard H. Rush, Andrew T. McReynolds, and Benjamin F. Davis.

Confederate

General Lee's Army of Northern Virginia was organized into two large infantry wings.

Maj. Gen. James Longstreet's Right Wing or Command consisted of the following divisions:
 Maj. Gen. Lafayette McLaws (brigades of Brig. Gens. Joseph B. Kershaw, Howell Cobb, Paul J. Semmes, and William Barksdale).
 Maj. Gen. Richard H. Anderson (brigades of Cols. Alfred Cumming, W. A. Parham, and Carnot Posey, and Brig. Gens. Lewis Armistead, Roger A. Pryor, and Ambrose R. Wright).
 Brig. Gen. David R. Jones (brigades of Brig. Gens. Robert A. Toombs, Thomas F. Drayton, Richard B. Garnett, James L. Kemper, and Cols. Joseph A. Walker and George T. Anderson).
 Brig. Gen. John G. Walker (brigades of Col. Van H. Manning and Brig. Gen. Robert Ransom, Jr.).
 Brig. Gen. John Bell Hood (brigades of Cols. William T. Wofford and Evander M. Law).
 Independent brigade under Brig. Gen. Nathan G. "Shanks" Evans.

Maj. Gen. Thomas J. "Stonewall" Jackson's Left Wing or Command consisted of the following divisions:
 Brig. Gen. Alexander R. Lawton (brigades of Col. Marcellus Douglass, Brig. Gen. Jubal A. Early, Col. James A. Walker, and Brig. Gen. Harry T. Hays).
 Maj. Gen. A.P. Hill (the Light Division—brigades of Brig. Gens. Lawrence O'Bryan Branch, Maxcy Gregg, James J. Archer, and William Dorsey Pender, and Cols. John M. Brockenbrough and Edward L. Thomas).
 Brig. Gen. John R. Jones (brigades of Cols. A.J. Grigsby, E. T. H. Warren, Bradley T. Johnson, and Brig. Gen. William E. Starke).
 Maj. Gen. D.H. Hill (brigades of Brig. Gens. Roswell S. Ripley, Robert E. Rodes, Samuel Garland, Jr., George B. Anderson, and Col. Alfred H. Colquitt).

The remaining units were the Cavalry Division, under Maj. Gen. J. E. B. Stuart, and the reserve artillery, commanded by Brig. Gen. William N. Pendleton. Jackson's left wing was organized with artillery attached to each division, in contrast to Longstreet's right wing, which reserved its artillery at the corps level.

Prelude to battle

Disposition of armies

Near the town of Sharpsburg, Lee deployed his available forces behind Antietam Creek along a low ridge, starting on September 15. While it was an effective defensive position, it was not an impregnable one. The terrain provided excellent cover for infantrymen, with rail and stone fences, outcroppings of limestone, little hollows and swales. The creek to their front was only a minor barrier, ranging from 60 to 100 feet (18–30 m) in width, and was fordable in places and crossed by three stone bridges each a mile (1.5 km) apart. It was also a precarious position because the Confederate rear was blocked by the Potomac River and only a single crossing point, Boteler's Ford at Shepherdstown, was nearby should retreat be necessary. The disposition of Union forces during the battle made it impractical to consider retreating in that direction.) And on September 15, the force under Lee's immediate command consisted of no more than 18,000 men, only a third the size of the Federal army.

The first two Union divisions arrived on the afternoon of September 15 and the bulk of the remainder of the army late that evening. Although an immediate Union attack on the morning of September 16 would have had an overwhelming advantage in numbers, McClellan's trademark caution and his belief that Lee had as many as 100,000 men at Sharpsburg caused him to delay his attack for a day. This gave the Confederates more time to prepare defensive positions and allowed Longstreet's corps to arrive from Hagerstown and Jackson's corps, minus A.P. Hill's division, to arrive from Harpers Ferry. Jackson defended the left (northern) flank, anchored on the Potomac, Longstreet the right (southern) flank, anchored on the Antietam, a line that was about 4 miles (6 km) long. (As the battle progressed and Lee shifted units, these corps boundaries overlapped considerably.)

On the evening of September 16, McClellan ordered Hooker's I Corps to cross Antietam Creek and probe the enemy positions. Meade's division cautiously attacked Hood's troops near the East Woods. After darkness fell, artillery fire continued as McClellan positioned his troops for the next day's fighting. McClellan's plan was to overwhelm the enemy's left flank. He arrived at this decision because of the configuration of bridges over the Antietam. The lower bridge (which would soon be named Burnside Bridge) was dominated by Confederate positions on the bluffs overlooking it. The middle bridge, on the road from Boonsboro, was subject to artillery fire from the heights near Sharpsburg. But the upper bridge was 2 miles (3 km) east of the Confederate guns and could be crossed safely. McClellan planned to commit more than half his army to the assault, starting with two corps, supported by a third, and if necessary a fourth. He intended to launch a simultaneous diversionary attack against the Confederate right with a fifth corps, and he was prepared to strike the center with his reserves if either attack succeeded. The skirmish in the East Woods served to signal McClellan's intentions to Lee, who prepared his defenses accordingly. He shifted men to his left flank and sent urgent messages to his two commanders who had not yet arrived on the battlefield: Lafayette McLaws with two divisions and A.P. Hill with one division.

Terrain and its consequences
McClellan's plans were ill-coordinated and were executed poorly. He issued to each of his subordinate commanders only the orders for his own corps, not general orders describing the entire battle plan. The terrain of the battlefield made it difficult for those commanders to monitor events outside of their sectors. Moreover, McClellan's headquarters were more than a mile in the rear (at the Philip Pry house, east of the creek). This made it difficult for him to control the separate corps. This is why the battle progressed the next day as essentially three separate, mostly uncoordinated battles: morning in the northern end of the battlefield, midday in the center, and afternoon in the south. This lack of coordination and concentration of McClellan's forces almost completely nullified the two-to-one advantage the Union enjoyed. It also allowed Lee to shift his defensive forces to meet each offensive.

Battle

Morning phase
Location: Northern end of the battlefield

Cornfield

The battle opened at dawn (about 5:30 a.m.) on September 17 with an attack down the Hagerstown Turnpike by the Union I Corps under Joseph Hooker. Hooker's objective was the plateau on which sat the Dunker Church, a modest whitewashed building belonging to a local sect of German Baptists. Hooker had approximately 8,600 men, little more than the 7,700 defenders under Stonewall Jackson, and this slight disparity was more than offset by the Confederates' strong defensive positions. Abner Doubleday's division moved on Hooker's right, James Ricketts's moved on the left into the East Woods, and George Meade's Pennsylvania Reserves division deployed in the center and slightly to the rear. Jackson's defense consisted of the divisions under Alexander Lawton and John R. Jones in line from the West Woods, across the Turnpike, and along the southern end of Miller's Cornfield. Four brigades were held in reserve inside the West Woods.

As the first Union men emerged from the North Woods and into the Cornfield, an artillery duel erupted. Confederate fire was from the horse artillery batteries under Jeb Stuart to the west and four batteries under Col. Stephen D. Lee on the high ground across the pike from the Dunker Church to the south. Union return fire was from nine batteries on the ridge behind the North Woods and twenty 20-pounder Parrott rifles, 2 miles (3 km) east of Antietam Creek. The conflagration caused heavy casualties on both sides and was described by Col. Lee as "artillery Hell."

Seeing the glint of Confederate bayonets concealed in the Cornfield, Hooker halted his infantry and brought up four batteries of artillery, which fired shell and canister over the heads of the Federal infantry into the field. A battle began, with considerable melee action with rifle butts and bayonets due to short visibility in the corn. Officers rode about cursing and yelling orders no one could hear in the noise. Rifles became hot and fouled from too much firing; the air was filled with a hail of bullets and shells.

Meade's 1st Brigade of Pennsylvanians, under Brig. Gen. Truman Seymour, began advancing through the East Woods and exchanged fire with Col. James Walker's brigade of Alabama, Georgia, and North Carolina troops. As Walker's men forced Seymour's back, aided by Lee's artillery fire, Ricketts's division entered the Cornfield, also to be torn up by artillery. Brig. Gen. Abram Duryée's brigade marched directly into volleys from Col. Marcellus Douglass's Georgia brigade.

The reinforcements that Duryée had expected—brigades under Brig. Gen. George L. Hartsuff and Col. William A. Christian—had difficulties reaching the scene. Hartsuff was wounded by a shell, and Christian dismounted and fled to the rear in terror. When the men were rallied and advanced into the Cornfield, they met the same artillery and infantry fire as their predecessors. As the superior Union numbers began to tell, the Louisiana "Tiger" Brigade under Harry Hays entered the fray and forced the Union men back to the East Woods. The casualties received by the 12th Massachusetts Infantry, 67%, were the highest of any unit that day. The Tigers were beaten back eventually when the Federals brought up a battery of 3-inch ordnance rifles and rolled them directly into the Cornfield, point-blank fire that slaughtered the Tigers, who lost 323 of their 500 men.

While the Cornfield remained a bloody stalemate, Federal advances a few hundred yards to the west were more successful. Brig. Gen. John Gibbon's 4th Brigade of Doubleday's division (recently named the Iron Brigade) began advancing down and astride the turnpike, into the cornfield, and in the West Woods, pushing aside Jackson's men. The Confederate brigade withdrew after being exposed to fierce return fire from the Iron Brigade, and Starke was mortally wounded. The Union advance on the Dunker Church resumed and cut a large gap in Jackson's defensive line, which teetered near collapse. Although the cost was steep, Hooker's corps was making steady progress.

Confederate reinforcements arrived just after 7a.m. The divisions under McLaws and Richard H. Anderson arrived following a night march from Harpers Ferry. Around 7:15, General Lee moved George T. Anderson's Georgia brigade from the right flank of the army to aid Jackson. At 7a.m., Hood's division of 2,300 men advanced through the West Woods and pushed the Union troops back through the Cornfield again. The Texans attacked with particular ferocity because as they were called from their reserve position they were forced to interrupt the first hot breakfast they had had in days. They were aided by three brigades of D.H. Hill's division arriving from the Mumma Farm, southeast of the Cornfield, and by Jubal Early's brigade, pushing through the West Woods from the Nicodemus Farm, where they had been supporting Jeb Stuart's horse artillery. Some officers of the Iron Brigade rallied men around the artillery pieces of Battery B, 4th U.S. Artillery, and Gibbon himself saw to it that his previous unit did not lose a single caisson. Hood's men bore the brunt of the fighting, however, and paid a heavy price—60% casualties—but they were able to prevent the defensive line from crumbling and held off the I Corps. When asked by a fellow officer where his division was, Hood replied, "Dead on the field."

Hooker's men had also paid heavily but without achieving their objectives. After two hours and 2,500 casualties, they were back where they started. It was estimated that the Cornfield changed hands no fewer than 15 times in the course of the morning. Maj. Rufus Dawes, who assumed command of Iron Brigade's 6th Wisconsin Regiment during the battle, later compared the fighting around the Hagerstown Turnpike with the stone wall at Fredericksburg, Spotsylvania's "Bloody Angle", and the slaughter pen of Cold Harbor, insisting that "the Antietam Turnpike surpassed them all in manifest evidence of slaughter." Hooker called for support from the 7,200 men of Mansfield's XII Corps.

Half of Mansfield's men were raw recruits, and Mansfield was also inexperienced, having taken command only two days before. Although he was a veteran of 40 years' service, he had never led large numbers of soldiers in combat. Concerned that his men would bolt under fire, he marched them in a formation that was known as "column of companies, closed in mass," a bunched-up formation in which a regiment was arrayed ten ranks deep instead of the normal two. As his men entered the East Woods, they presented an excellent artillery target, "almost as good a target as a barn." Mansfield himself was shot in the chest and died the next day. Alpheus Williams assumed temporary command of the XII Corps.

The new recruits of Mansfield's 1st Division made no progress against Hood's line, which was reinforced by brigades of D. H. Hill's division under Colquitt and McRae. The 2nd Division of the XII Corps, under George Sears Greene, however, broke through McRae's men, who fled under the mistaken belief that they were about to be trapped by a flanking attack. This breach of the line forced Hood and his men, outnumbered, to regroup in the West Woods, where they had started the day. Greene was able to reach the Dunker Church, Hooker's original objective, and drove off Stephen Lee's batteries. Federal forces held most of the ground to the east of the turnpike.

Hooker attempted to gather the scattered remnants of his I Corps to continue the assault, but a Confederate sharpshooter spotted the general's conspicuous white horse and shot Hooker through the foot. Command of his I Corps fell to General Meade, since Hooker's senior subordinate, James B. Ricketts, had also been wounded. But with Hooker removed from the field, there was no general left with the authority to rally the men of the I and XII Corps. Greene's men came under heavy fire from the West Woods and withdrew from the Dunker Church.

In an effort to turn the Confederate left flank and relieve the pressure on Mansfield's men, Sumner's II Corps was ordered at 7:20 a.m. to send two divisions into battle. Sedgwick's division of 5,400 men was the first to ford the Antietam, and they entered the East Woods with the intention of turning left and forcing the Confederates south into the assault of Ambrose Burnside's IX Corps. But the plan went awry. They became separated from William H. French's division, and at 9a.m. Sumner, who was accompanying the division, launched the attack with an unusual battle formation—the three brigades in three long lines, men side-by-side, with only 50 to  separating the lines. They were assaulted first by Confederate artillery and then from three sides by the divisions of Early, Walker, and McLaws, and in less than half an hour Sedgwick's men were forced to retreat in great disorder to their starting point with over 2,200 casualties, including Sedgwick himself, who was taken out of action for several months by a wound. Sumner has been condemned by most historians for his "reckless" attack, his lack of coordination with the I and XII Corps headquarters, losing control of French's division when he accompanied Sedgwick's, failing to perform adequate reconnaissance prior to launching his attack, and selecting the unusual battle formation that was so effectively flanked by the Confederate counterattack. Historian M. V. Armstrong's recent scholarship, however, has determined that Sumner did perform appropriate reconnaissance and his decision to attack where he did was justified by the information available to him.

The final actions in the morning phase of the battle were around 10a.m., when two regiments of the XII Corps advanced, only to be confronted by the division of John G. Walker, newly arrived from the Confederate right. They fought in the area between the Cornfield in the West Woods, but soon Walker's men were forced back by two brigades of Greene's division, and the Federal troops seized some ground in the West Woods.

The morning phase ended with casualties on both sides of almost 13,000, including two Union corps commanders.

Midday phase
Location: Center of the Confederate line

Sunken Road: "Bloody Lane"

By midday, the action had shifted to the center of the Confederate line. Sumner had accompanied the morning attack of Sedgwick's division, but another of his divisions, under French, lost contact with Sumner and Sedgwick and inexplicably headed south. Eager for an opportunity to see combat, French found skirmishers in his path and ordered his men forward. By this time, Sumner's aide (and son) located French, described the terrible fighting in the West Woods and relayed an order for him to divert Confederate attention by attacking their center.

French confronted D.H. Hill's division. Hill commanded about 2,500 men, less than half the number under French, and three of his five brigades had been torn up during the morning combat. This sector of Longstreet's line was theoretically the weakest. But Hill's men were in a strong defensive position, atop a gradual ridge, in a sunken road worn down by years of wagon traffic, which formed a natural trench.

French launched a series of brigade-sized assaults against Hill's improvised breastworks at around 9:30 a.m.. The first brigade to attack, mostly inexperienced troops commanded by Brig. Gen. Max Weber, was quickly cut down by heavy rifle fire; neither side deployed artillery at this point. The second attack, more raw recruits under Col. Dwight Morris, was also subjected to heavy fire but managed to beat back a counterattack by the Alabama Brigade of Robert Rodes. The third, under Brig. Gen. Nathan Kimball, included three veteran regiments, but they also fell to fire from the sunken road. French's division suffered 1,750 casualties (of his 5,700 men) in under an hour.

Reinforcements were arriving on both sides, and by 10:30 a.m. Robert E. Lee sent his final reserve division—some 3,400 men under Maj. Gen. Richard H. Anderson—to bolster Hill's line and extend it to the right, preparing an attack that would envelop French's left flank. But at the same time, the 4,000 men of Maj. Gen. Israel B. Richardson's division arrived on French's left. This was the last of Sumner's three divisions, which had been held up in the rear by McClellan as he organized his reserve forces. Richardson's fresh troops struck the first blow.

Leading off the fourth attack of the day against the sunken road was the Irish Brigade of Brig. Gen. Thomas F. Meagher. As they advanced with emerald green flags snapping in the breeze, a regimental chaplain, Father William Corby, rode back and forth across the front of the formation shouting words of conditional absolution prescribed by the Roman Catholic Church for those who were about to die. (Corby would later perform a similar service at Gettysburg in 1863.) The mostly Irish immigrants lost 540 men to heavy volleys before they were ordered to withdraw.

Gen. Richardson personally dispatched the brigade of Brig. Gen. John C. Caldwell into battle around noon (after being told that Caldwell was in the rear, behind a haystack), and finally the tide turned. Anderson's Confederate division had been little help to the defenders after Gen. Anderson was wounded early in the fighting. Other key leaders were lost as well, including George B. Anderson (no relation; Anderson's successor, Col. Charles C. Tew of the 2nd North Carolina, was killed minutes after assuming command) and Col. John B. Gordon of the 6th Alabama. (Gordon received 5 serious wounds in the fight, twice in his right leg, twice in the left arm, and once in the face. He lay unconscious, face down in his cap, and later told colleagues that he should have smothered in his own blood, except for the act of an unidentified Yankee, who had earlier shot a hole in his cap, which allowed the blood to drain.) Rodes was wounded in the thigh but was still on the field. These losses contributed directly to the confusion of the following events.

As Caldwell's brigade advanced around the right flank of the Confederates, Col. Francis C. Barlow and 350 men of the 61st and 64th New York saw a weak point in the line and seized a knoll commanding the sunken road. This allowed them to get enfilade fire into the Confederate line, turning it into a deadly trap. In attempting to wheel around to meet this threat, a command from Rodes was misunderstood by Lt. Col. James N. Lightfoot, who had succeeded the unconscious John Gordon. Lightfoot ordered his men to about-face and march away, an order that all five regiments of the brigade thought applied to them as well. Confederate troops streamed toward Sharpsburg, their line lost.

Richardson's men were in hot pursuit when massed artillery hastily assembled by Gen. Longstreet drove them back. A counterattack with 200 men led by D.H. Hill got around the Federal left flank near the sunken road, and although they were driven back by a fierce charge of the 5th New Hampshire, this stemmed the collapse of the center. Reluctantly, Richardson ordered his division to fall back to north of the ridge facing the sunken road. His division lost about 1,000 men. Col. Barlow was severely wounded, and Richardson mortally wounded. Winfield S. Hancock assumed division command. Although Hancock would have an excellent future reputation as an aggressive division and corps commander, the unexpected change of command sapped the momentum of the Federal advance.

The carnage from 9:30 a.m. to 1:00 p.m. on the sunken road gave it the name Bloody Lane, leaving about 5,600 casualties (Union 3,000, Confederate 2,600) along the  road. And yet, a great opportunity presented itself. If this broken sector of the Confederate line were exploited, Lee's army would be divided in half and possibly defeated. There were ample forces available to do so. There was a reserve of 3,500 cavalry and the 10,300 infantrymen of Gen. Porter's V Corps, waiting near the middle bridge, a mile away. The VI Corps, under Maj. Gen. William B. Franklin, had just arrived with 12,000 men. Franklin was ready to exploit this breakthrough, but Sumner, the senior corps commander, ordered him not to advance. Franklin appealed to McClellan, who left his headquarters in the rear to hear both arguments but backed Sumner's decision, ordering Franklin and Hancock to hold their positions.

Later in the day, the commander of the other reserve unit near the center, the V Corps, Maj. Gen. Fitz John Porter, heard recommendations from Maj. Gen. George Sykes, commanding his 2nd Division, that another attack be made in the center, an idea that intrigued McClellan. However, Porter is said to have told McClellan, "Remember, General, I command the last reserve of the last Army of the Republic." McClellan demurred and another opportunity was lost.

Afternoon phase
Location: Southern end of the battlefield

"Burnside's Bridge"

The action moved to the southern end of the battlefield. McClellan's plan called for Maj. Gen. Ambrose Burnside and the IX Corps to conduct a diversionary attack in support of Hooker's I Corps, hoping to draw Confederate attention away from the intended main attack in the north. However, Burnside was instructed to wait for explicit orders before launching his attack, and those orders did not reach him until 10a.m. Burnside was strangely passive during preparations for the battle. He was disgruntled that McClellan had abandoned the previous arrangement of "wing" commanders reporting to him. Previously, Burnside had commanded a wing that included both the I and IX Corps and now he was responsible only for the IX Corps. Implicitly refusing to give up his higher authority, Burnside treated first Maj. Gen. Jesse L. Reno (killed at South Mountain) and then Brig. Gen. Jacob D. Cox of the Kanawha Division as the corps commander, funneling orders to the corps through him.

Burnside had four divisions (12,500 troops) and 50 guns east of Antietam Creek. Facing him was a force that had been greatly depleted by Lee's movement of units to bolster the Confederate left flank. At dawn, the divisions of Brig. Gens. David R. Jones and John G. Walker stood in defense, but by 10a.m. all of Walker's men and Col. George T. Anderson's Georgia brigade had been removed. Jones had only about 3,000 men and 12 guns available to meet Burnside. Four thin brigades guarded the ridges near Sharpsburg, primarily a low plateau known as Cemetery Hill. The remaining 400 men—the 2nd and 20th Georgia regiments, under the command of Brig. Gen. Robert Toombs, with two artillery batteries—defended Rohrbach's Bridge, a three-span, 125-foot (38 m) stone structure that was the southernmost crossing of the Antietam. It would become known to history as Burnside's Bridge because of the notoriety of the coming battle. The bridge was a difficult objective. The road leading to it ran parallel to the creek and was exposed to enemy fire. The bridge was dominated by a 100-foot (30 m) high wooded bluff on the west bank, strewn with boulders from an old quarry, making infantry and sharpshooter fire from good covered positions a dangerous impediment to crossing.

Antietam Creek in this sector was seldom more than 50 feet (15 m) wide, and several stretches were only waist deep and out of Confederate range. Burnside has been widely criticized for ignoring this fact. However, the commanding terrain across the sometimes shallow creek made crossing the water a comparatively easy part of a difficult problem. Burnside concentrated his plan instead on storming the bridge while simultaneously crossing a ford McClellan's engineers had identified a half mile (1 km) downstream, but when Burnside's men reached it, they found the banks too high to negotiate. While Col. George Crook's Ohio brigade prepared to attack the bridge with the support of Brig. Gen. Samuel Sturgis's division, the rest of the Kanawha Division and Brig. Gen. Isaac Rodman's division struggled through thick brush trying to locate Snavely's Ford, 2 miles (3 km) downstream, intending to flank the Confederates.

Crook's assault on the bridge was led by skirmishers from the 11th Connecticut, who were ordered to clear the bridge for the Ohioans to cross and assault the bluff. After receiving punishing fire for 15 minutes, the Connecticut men withdrew with 139 casualties, one-third of their strength, including their commander, Col. Henry W. Kingsbury, who was fatally wounded. Crook's main assault went awry when his unfamiliarity with the terrain caused his men to reach the creek a quarter mile (400 m) upstream from the bridge, where they exchanged volleys with Confederate skirmishers for the next few hours.

While Rodman's division was out of touch, slogging toward Snavely's Ford, Burnside and Cox directed a second assault at the bridge by one of Sturgis's brigades, led by the 2nd Maryland and 6th New Hampshire. They also fell prey to the Confederate sharpshooters and artillery, and their attack fell apart. By this time it was noon, and McClellan was losing patience. He sent a succession of couriers to motivate Burnside to move forward. He ordered one aide, "Tell him if it costs 10,000 men he must go now." He increased the pressure by sending his inspector general, Col. Delos B. Sackett, to confront Burnside, who reacted indignantly: "McClellan appears to think I am not trying my best to carry this bridge; you are the third or fourth one who has been to me this morning with similar orders."

The third attempt to take the bridge was at 12:30 p.m. by Sturgis's other brigade, commanded by Brig. Gen. Edward Ferrero. It was led by the 51st New York and the 51st Pennsylvania, who, with adequate artillery support and a promise that a recently canceled whiskey ration would be restored if they were successful, charged downhill and took up positions on the east bank. Maneuvering a captured light howitzer into position, they fired double canister down the bridge and got within  of the enemy. By 1p.m., Confederate ammunition was running low, and word reached Toombs that Rodman's men were crossing Snavely's Ford on their flank. He ordered a withdrawal. His Georgians had cost the Federals more than 500 casualties, giving up fewer than 160 themselves. And they had stalled Burnside's assault on the southern flank for more than three hours.

Burnside's assault stalled again on its own. His officers had neglected to transport ammunition across the bridge, which was itself becoming a bottleneck for soldiers, artillery, and wagons. This represented another two-hour delay. Gen. Lee used this time to bolster his right flank. He ordered up every available artillery unit, although he made no attempt to strengthen D.R. Jones's badly outnumbered force with infantry units from the left. Instead, he counted on the arrival of A.P. Hill's Light Division, currently embarked on an exhausting 17 mile (27 km) march from Harpers Ferry. By 2p.m., Hill's men had reached Boteler's Ford, and Hill was able to confer with the relieved Lee at 2:30, who ordered him to bring up his men to the right of Jones.

The Federals were completely unaware that 3,000 new men would be facing them. Burnside's plan was to move around the weakened Confederate right flank, converge on Sharpsburg, and cut Lee's army off from Boteler's Ford, their only escape route across the Potomac. At 3p.m., Burnside left Sturgis's division in reserve on the west bank and moved west with over 8,000 troops (most of them fresh) and 22 guns for close support.

An initial assault led by the 79th New York "Cameron Highlanders" succeeded against Jones's outnumbered division, which was pushed back past Cemetery Hill and to within  of Sharpsburg. Farther to the Union left, Rodman's division advanced toward Harpers Ferry Road. Its lead brigade, under Col. Harrison Fairchild, containing several colorful Zouaves of the 9th New York, commanded by Col. Rush Hawkins, came under heavy shellfire from a dozen enemy guns mounted on a ridge to their front, but they kept pushing forward. There was panic in the streets of Sharpsburg, clogged with retreating Confederates. Of the five brigades in Jones's division, only Toombs's brigade was still intact, but he had only 700 men.

A. P. Hill's division arrived at 3:30 p.m. Hill divided his column, with two brigades moving southeast to guard his flank and the other three, about 2,000 men, moving to the right of Toombs's brigade and preparing for a counterattack. At 3:40 p.m., Brig. Gen. Maxcy Gregg's brigade of South Carolinians attacked the 16th Connecticut on Rodman's left flank in the cornfield of farmer John Otto. The Connecticut men had been in service for only three weeks, and their line disintegrated with 185 casualties. The 4th Rhode Island came up on the right, but they had poor visibility amid the high stalks of corn, and they were disoriented because many of the Confederates were wearing Union uniforms captured at Harpers Ferry. They also broke and ran, leaving the 8th Connecticut far out in advance and isolated. They were enveloped and driven down the hills toward Antietam Creek. A counterattack by regiments from the Kanawha Division fell short.

The IX Corps had suffered casualties of about 20% but still possessed twice the number of Confederates confronting them. Unnerved by the collapse of his flank, Burnside ordered his men all the way back to the west bank of the Antietam, where he urgently requested more men and guns. McClellan was able to provide just one battery. He said, "I can do nothing more. I have no infantry." In fact, however, McClellan had two fresh corps in reserve, Porter's V and Franklin's VI, but he was too cautious, concerned he was greatly outnumbered and that a massive counterstrike by Lee was imminent. Burnside's men spent the rest of the day guarding the bridge they had suffered so much to capture.

Aftermath

The battle was over by 5:30 p.m. On the morning of September 18, Lee's army prepared to defend against a Federal assault that never came. After an improvised truce for both sides to recover and exchange their wounded, Lee's forces began withdrawing across the Potomac that evening to return to Virginia. Losses from the battle were heavy on both sides. The Union had 12,410 casualties with 2,108 dead. Confederate casualties were 10,316 with 1,547 dead. This represented 25% of the Federal force and 31% of the Confederates. Overall, both sides lost a combined total of 22,726 casualties in a single day, almost the same amount as the number of losses that had shocked the nation at the 2-day Battle of Shiloh five months earlier. Of the other casualties, 1,910 Union and 1,550 Confederate troops died of their wounds soon after the battle, while 225 Union and 306 Confederate troops listed as missing were later confirmed as dead. Several generals died as a result of the battle, including Maj. Gens. Joseph K. Mansfield and Israel B. Richardson and Brig. Gen. Isaac P. Rodman on the Union side, and Brig. Gens. Lawrence O. Branch and William E. Starke on the Confederate side. Confederate Brig. Gen. George B. Anderson was shot in the ankle during the defense of the Bloody Lane. He survived the battle but died later in October after an amputation. The fighting on September 17, 1862, killed 7,650 American soldiers. More Americans died in battle on September 17, 1862, than on any other day in the nation's history. Antietam is sometimes cited as the bloodiest day in all of American history. Antietam ranks fifth in terms of total casualties in Civil War battles, falling behind Gettysburg, Chickamauga, Chancellorsville, and Spotsylvania Court House.

President Lincoln was disappointed in McClellan's performance. He believed that McClellan's overly cautious and poorly coordinated actions in the field had forced the battle to a draw rather than a crippling Confederate defeat. The president was even more astonished that from September 17 to October 26, despite repeated entreaties from the War Department and the president himself, McClellan declined to pursue Lee across the Potomac, citing shortages of equipment and the fear of overextending his forces. General-in-Chief Henry W. Halleck wrote in his official report, "The long inactivity of so large an army in the face of a defeated foe, and during the most favorable season for rapid movements and a vigorous campaign, was a matter of great disappointment and regret." Lincoln relieved McClellan of his command of the Army of the Potomac on November 5, effectively ending the general's military career. He was replaced on November 9 by General Burnside.

Casualties were comparable on both sides, although Lee lost a higher percentage of his army. Lee withdrew from the battlefield first, the technical definition of the tactical loser in a Civil War battle. However, in a strategic sense, despite being a tactical draw, Antietam is considered a turning point of the war and a victory for the Union because it ended Lee's strategic campaign (his first invasion of Union territory). American historian James M. McPherson summed up the importance of the Battle of Antietam in his book, Crossroads of Freedom:

The results of Antietam also allowed President Lincoln to issue the preliminary Emancipation Proclamation on September 22, which gave Confederate states until January 1, 1863, to end their rebellion or else lose their slaves. Although Lincoln had intended to do so earlier, Secretary of State William H. Seward, at a cabinet meeting, advised him to wait until the Union won a significant victory so as to avoid the perception that it was issued out of desperation.

The Union victory and Lincoln's proclamation played a considerable role in dissuading the governments of France and Britain from recognizing the Confederacy; some suspected they were planning to do so in the aftermath of another Union defeat. When emancipation was linked to the progress of the war, neither government had the political will to oppose the United States, since it linked support of the Confederacy to support for slavery. Both countries had already abolished slavery, and the public would not have tolerated the government militarily supporting a sovereignty upholding the ideals of slavery.

Battlefield preservation
The battle is commemorated at Antietam National Battlefield. Conservation work undertaken by Antietam National Battlefield and private groups, has earned Antietam a reputation as one of the nation's best preserved Civil War battlefields. Few visual intrusions mar the landscape, letting visitors experience the site nearly as it was in 1862.

Antietam was one of the first five Civil War battlefields preserved federally, receiving that distinction on August 30, 1890. The U.S. War Department also placed over 300 tablets at that time to mark the spots of individual regiments and of significant phases in the battle. The battlefield was transferred to the Department of the Interior in 1933. The Antietam National Battlefield now consists of 2,743 acres.

The American Battlefield Trust and its partners have acquired and preserved 464 acres of the Antietam Battlefield as of late 2021. In 2015, the Trust saved 44.4 acres in the heart of the battlefield, between the Cornfield and the Dunker Church, when it purchased the Wilson farm for about $1 million. The preservation organization has since removed the postwar house and barn that stood on the property along Hagerstown Pike and returned the land to its wartime appearance.

Historic photographs and paintings

Mathew Brady's gallery, "The Dead of Antietam"
On September 19, 1862, two days after the Battle of Antietam, Mathew Brady sent photographer Alexander Gardner and his assistant James Gibson to photograph the carnage. In October 1862 Brady displayed the photos by Gardner in an exhibition entitled "The Dead of Antietam" at Brady's New York gallery. Many images in this presentation were graphic photographs of corpses, a presentation new to America. This was the first time that many Americans saw the realities of war in photographs as distinct from previous "artists' impressions". The New York Times published a review on October 20, 1862, describing how, "Of all objects of horror one would think the battle-field should stand preeminent, that it should bear away the palm of repulsiveness." But crowds came to the gallery drawn by a "terrible fascination" to the images of mangled corpses which brought the reality of remote battle fields to New Yorkers. Viewers examined details using a magnifying glass. "We would scarce choose to be in the gallery, when one of the women bending over them should recognize a husband, a son, or a brother in the still, lifeless lines of bodies, that lie ready for the gaping trenches."

James Hope murals
Capt. James Hope of the 2nd Vermont Infantry, a professional artist, painted five large murals based on battlefield scenes he had sketched during the Battle of Antietam. He had been assigned to sideline duties as a scout and mapmaker due to his injuries. The canvasses were exhibited in his gallery in Watkins Glen, New York, until his death in 1892. He had prints made of these larger paintings and sold the reproductions. In the 1930s, his work was damaged in a flood. The original murals were shown in a church for many years. In 1979, the National Park Service purchased and restored them. They were featured in a 1984 Time-Life book entitled The Bloodiest Day: The Battle of Antietam.

Gallery
The images below include photographs by Alexander Gardner, who was employed by Mathew Brady and whose photographs were exhibited in Brady's New York gallery in October 1862, and the murals by James Hope restored by the National Park Service.

See also
 Antietam National Battlefield
 Armies in the American Civil War
 Bibliography of Abraham Lincoln
 Bibliography of the American Civil War
 Bibliography of Ulysses S. Grant
 List of American Civil War battles
 List of costliest American Civil War land battles
 Troop engagements of the American Civil War, 1862
 USS Antietam

Citations

Bibliography

Secondary sources
 
 
 Cannan, John. The Antietam Campaign: August–September 1862. Mechanicsburg, PA: Stackpole, 1994. .
 
 Esposito, Vincent J. West Point Atlas of American Wars. New York: Frederick A. Praeger, 1959. . The collection of maps (without explanatory text) is available online at the West Point website.
 Frassanito, William A. Antietam: The Photographic Legacy of America's Bloodiest Day. Gettysburg, PA: Thomas Publications, 1978. .
 Harsh, Joseph L. Sounding the Shallows: A Confederate Companion for the Maryland Campaign of 1862. Kent, OH: Kent State University Press, 2000. .
 Harsh, Joseph L. Taken at the Flood: Robert E. Lee and Confederate Strategy in the Maryland Campaign of 1862. Kent, OH: Kent State University Press, 1999. .
 Jamieson, Perry D. Death in September: The Antietam Campaign. Abilene, TX: McWhiney Foundation Press, 1999. .
 Kalasky, Robert. "Union dead...Confederate Dead'." Military Images Magazine. Volume XX, Number 6, May–June 1999.
 Kennedy, Frances H., ed. The Civil War Battlefield Guide. 2nd ed. Boston: Houghton Mifflin Co., 1998. .
 Luvaas, Jay, and Harold W. Nelson, eds. Guide to the Battle of Antietam. Lawrence: University Press of Kansas, 1987. .
 
 Priest, John Michael. Antietam: The Soldiers' Battle. New York: Oxford University Press, 1989. .
 
 Tucker, Phillip Thomas. Burnside's Bridge: The Climactic Struggle of the 2nd and 20th Georgia at Antietam Creek. Mechanicsburg, PA: Stackpole Books, 2000. .
 Welcher, Frank J. The Union Army, 1861–1865 Organization and Operations. Vol. 1, The Eastern Theater. Bloomington: Indiana University Press, 1989. .
 
 National Park Service battle description

Primary sources
  First published by E. R. Alderman and Sons.
 
 
 Tidball, John C. The Artillery Service in the War of the Rebellion, 1861–1865. Westholme Publishing, 2011. .
 U.S. War Department, The War of the Rebellion: a Compilation of the Official Records of the Union and Confederate Armies. Washington, DC: U.S. Government Printing Office, 1880–1901.

Further reading
 Armstrong Marion V., Jr. Unfurl Those Colors! McClellan, Sumner, and the Second Army Corps in the Antietam Campaign. Tuscaloosa: University of Alabama Press, 2008. .
 Ballard, Ted. Battle of Antietam: Staff Ride Guide. Washington, DC: United States Army Center of Military History, 2006. .
 Breeden, James O. "Field Medicine at Antietam." Caduceus: A Humanities Journal for Medicine and the Health Sciences 10#1 (1994): 8–22.
 Carman, Ezra Ayers. The Maryland Campaign of September 1862: Ezra A. Carman's Definitive Account of the Union and Confederate Armies at Antietam. Edited by Joseph Pierro. New York: Routledge, 2008. .
 Carman, Ezra Ayers. The Maryland Campaign of September 1862. Vol. 1, South Mountain. Edited by Thomas G. Clemens. El Dorado Hills, CA: Savas Beatie, 2010. .
 Catton, Bruce. "Crisis at the Antietam". American Heritage 9#5 (August 1958): 54–96.
 Frassanito, William A. Antietam: The Photographic Legacy of America's Bloodiest Day. New York: Scribner, 1978. .
 Frye, Dennis E. Antietam Shadows: Mystery, Myth & Machination. Sharpsburg, MD: Antietam Rest Publishing, 2018. .
 Gallagher, Gary W., ed. Antietam: Essays on the 1862 Maryland Campaign. Kent, OH: Kent State University Press, 1989. .
 Gottfried, Bradley M. The Maps of Antietam: An Atlas of the Antietam (Sharpsburg) Campaign, including the Battle of South Mountain, September 2–20, 1862. El Dorado Hills, CA: Savas Beatie, 2011. .
 Hartwig, D. Scott. To Antietam Creek: The Maryland Campaign of 1862. Baltimore: The Johns Hopkins University Press, 2012. .
 Jamieson, Perry D., and Bradford A. Wineman, The Maryland and Fredericksburg Campaigns, 1862–1863 . Washington, DC: United States Army Center of Military History, 2015. CMH Pub 75-6.
 Jermann, Donald R. Antietam: The Lost Order. Gretna, LA: Pelican Publishing Co., 2006. .
 Murfin, James V. The Gleam of Bayonets: The Battle of Antietam and the Maryland Campaign of 1862. Baton Rouge: Louisiana State University Press, 1965. .
 
 Reardon, Carol and Tom Vossler. A Field Guide to Antietam: Experiencing the Battlefield through Its History, Places, and People (U of North Carolina Press, 2016) 347 pp.
 Slotkin, Richard. The Long Road to Antietam: How the Civil War Became a Revolution. New York: Liveright, 2012. .
 Vermilya, Daniel J. That Field of Blood: The Battle of Antietam, September 17, 1862. Emerging Civil War Series. El Dorado Hills, CA: Savas Beatie, 2018. .

External links

 The Battle of Antietam: Battle Maps, histories, photos, and preservation news (Civil War Trust)
 Antietam National Battlefield Park
 Antietam on the Web
 Atlas of the battlefield of Antietam (Library of Congress).
 Animated history of the Battle of Antietam
 Official Reports from Antietam
 Official Records: The Battle of Antietam (Sharpsburg),"the bloodiest day of the Civil War" (September 17, 1862)
 USS Antietam
 Brotherswar.com The Battle of Antietam
 Antietam Animated Map
 John Gould's Antietam Papers Collection at Dartmouth College Library

1862 in the United States
Maryland campaign
Battles of the Eastern Theater of the American Civil War
Battles of the American Civil War in Maryland
Union victories of the American Civil War
History of Washington County, Maryland
Invasions of the United States
1862 in Maryland
1862 in the American Civil War
September 1862 events